Joseph Wery (1836–1907) was a member of the Wisconsin State Assembly, elected in 1888. He represented Kewaunee in the Assembly. Other positions he held include Sheriff and member of the county board of Kewaunee County, Wisconsin. He was a Democrat.

Wery was born on September 29, 1836, in Belgium. He married Adolphine M.(1844–1920). Wery died October 24, 1907, in Champion, Wisconsin and was buried in Bay View, Kewaunee County, Wisconsin.

References

1836 births
1907 deaths
Belgian emigrants to the United States
People from Kewaunee County, Wisconsin
County supervisors in Wisconsin
Wisconsin sheriffs
19th-century American politicians
Democratic Party members of the Wisconsin State Assembly